Bangladesh is a country in South Asia. It is the eighth-most populous country in the world, (with over 166 million people). 

It is one of the emerging and growth-leading economies of the world. It is listed among the Next Eleven countries, it has one of the fastest real GDP growth rate. Its gross domestic product ranks 39th largest in the world in terms of market exchange rates and 29th in purchasing power parity. Its per capita income ranks 143rd and 136th in two measures. In the field of human development, it has progressed ahead in life expectancy, maternal and child health, and gender equality.

Small, medium and large family owned conglomerates dominate over Bangladesh's economy. Most of these businesses in Bangladesh are grouped as conglomerates unlike other countries.

Notable firms 
This list includes notable companies with primary headquarters located in the country. The industry and sector follow the Industry Classification Benchmark taxonomy. Organizations which have ceased operations are included and noted as defunct.

See also 
 Economy of Bangladesh
 Dhaka Stock Exchange
 Chittagong Stock Exchange
 Pharmaceutical industry in Bangladesh
 List of Bangladeshi record labels
 List of Banks in Bangladesh
 List of Insurance Companies in Bangladesh

References

External links 
Bangladesh 200
Bloomberg DSE stock listing

 
Bangladesh